Boris Becker defeated Pete Sampras in the final, 3–6, 6–3, 3–6, 6–3, 6–4 to win the singles tennis title at the 1996 Eurocard Open.

Thomas Muster was the defending champion, but lost in the second round to Mark Woodforde.

Seeds
A champion seed is indicated in bold text while text in italics indicates the round in which that seed was eliminated. All sixteen seeds received a bye into the second round.

  Pete Sampras (final)
  Michael Chang (semifinals)
  Thomas Muster (second round)
  Yevgeny Kafelnikov (second round)
  Goran Ivanišević (quarterfinals)
  Boris Becker (champion)
  Wayne Ferreira (second round)
  Richard Krajicek (third round)
  Andre Agassi (quarterfinals)
  Marcelo Ríos (quarterfinals)
  Todd Martin (third round)
  Thomas Enqvist (third round)
  MaliVai Washington (second round)
  Albert Costa (second round)
  Jim Courier (third round)
  Félix Mantilla (third round)

Draw

Finals

Top half

Section 1

Section 2

Bottom half

Section 3

Section 4

References
 1996 Eurocard Open Draw

Singles